Abdullah Mohammed (Arabic:عبد الله محمد; born 22 September 1992) is an Emirati footballer. He currently plays as a winger for Dibba Al Fujairah.

References

External links
 

Emirati footballers
1992 births
Living people
Emirates Club players
Dibba FC players
Place of birth missing (living people)
UAE Pro League players
UAE First Division League players
Association football wingers
Association football fullbacks